Vishnuvardhan is an Indian film director, producer and screenwriter who predominantly works in the Tamil cinema.

A one-time associate of Santosh Sivan, he made his directorial debut in 2003 with Kurumbu, which did not fare well at the box office. However, his subsequent films, Arinthum Ariyamalum (2005), Pattiyal (2006), Billa (2007), Panjaa (2011) with Pawan kalyan as main lead and Arrambam (2013) went on to become highly successful ventures, turning him into a household name in Tamil Nadu. He made his hindi film directorial debut with Shershaah (2021), for which he received positive reviews.

Early life
Vishnuvardhan was born and raised in Chennai, Tamil Nadu. His father is Kulasekaran, a businessman, who later became a producer of Tamil films. He has a younger brother Krishna Kulasekaran who is an actor in the Tamil film industry. Vishnuvardhan went to St. Bede's Anglo Indian Higher Secondary School, Chennai and studied visual communication at the Loyola College, Chennai.

Vishnuvardhan and his brother used to participate in extra-curricular activities like dance and drama in school. When director Mani Ratnam was looking for children to cast in his film Anjali, his school suggested his name and he shot for a dance sequence in the film with his brother and other children. He later appeared in Sathriyan (as the young Vijayakanth) and Iruvar by Mani Ratnam again. While in college, Santosh Sivan, cinematographer of Mani Ratnam's films, called Vishnuvardhan to act in his directorial The Terrorist. Vishnuvardhan said "I was influenced and inspired by the works of Mani Ratnam and Santosh Sivan. Watching them create magic on screen fascinated me and I wanted to learn filmmaking". While working for The Terrorist, he expressed his desire to Sivan, that he would like to assist him, and Sivan accepted him as an apprentice and later as an associate.He worked for seven years as an assistant director to Sivan in Mumbai besides playing roles in his films Fiza, Malli and Asoka.

Career

After Vishnuvardhan returned from Mumbai, Gemini Color Labs that had produced The Terrorist offered him to remake the Telugu comedy film Allari in Tamil. Although he did not want his first film to be a remake, he accepted since he felt he shouldn't "ruin the chance". The film, titled Kurumbu, featuring Allari Naresh, who played the same role in the original, alongside Nikita Thukral and Diya, did not do well at the box office. His next film was Arinthum Ariyamalum, which was the first script he had written and was supposed to mark his directorial debut. He said that no big hero wanted to star in it and nobody wanted to produce the film. After he had signed the principal cast, he decided to start his own production studio SJ Films with Malaysian radio jockey, Punnagai Poo Geetha, and produce the film on his own. Starring Prakash Raj, alongside then newcomers Arya, Navdeep and Samiksha, the film was better received than his first film, critically as well as commercially. Sify called it "a taut and fairly engrossing entertainer" and the film was termed a "super hit" having collected twice its cost at the box office.

Geetha and Vishnu then collaborated once more in the critically acclaimed Pattiyal which also proved to be successful. The film, which starred Arya, Bharath, Pooja and Padmapriya, was recognised for its outstanding music by Yuvan Shankar Raja. Vishnu was praised for handling a serious subject while retaining the entertainment factor in the film. Sify stated that Vishnuvardhan "rewrote the rules of Tamil commercial cinema", and went on to compare him with director Mani Ratnam. In an interview, Vishnu stated that he had interacted with real gangsters and studied their lifestyle. Vishnuvardhan's next film Billa, a remake of the yesteryear classic, starring Ajith Kumar, Nayanthara and Namitha, was a big blockbuster. His Sarvam starring Arya and Trisha which received mixed reviews did averagely at the box office whereas his next debut film in Telugu, Panjaa, was one of the most stylish films of Pawan Kalyan. Vishnuvardhan's next directorial, Arrambam starring Ajith Kumar, Nayanthara and Arya was a huge success.

Personal life
Vishnuvardhan is married to costume designer Anu Vardhan, granddaughter of Tamil actor and singer N. S. Krishnan. Anu was a classmate of Vishnuvardhan in college and also worked as an assistant to Santosh Sivan. Vishnuvardhan stated that they got married "just after college" when he had joined the industry as an assistant director. Anu has worked as the costume designer in all of Vishnuvardhan's films.

Filmography

As director and writer

As actor

Awards and nominations

References

External links
 

Tamil film directors
Tamil-language film directors
Film directors from Chennai
Living people
Loyola College, Chennai alumni
Male actors from Chennai
Indian male film actors
Male actors in Tamil cinema
21st-century Indian film directors
20th-century Indian male actors
21st-century Indian male actors
1978 births